The Treaty of Madrid was signed on 26 April 1621 by French courtier, François de Bassompierre. Based on the terms of the treaty, the Valtelline was restored to the Grisons and the Spanish were allowed to reoccupy Chiavenna. Moreover, the accord guaranteed religious amnesty to the Protestants in Valtelline and allowed them to practice their faith freely. The guarantors of this treaty were the King of France, Louis XIII, and the Swiss Confederation.
By the Treaty of Madrid, the Spanish government agreed to restore Grisons sovereignty over the Val Tellina and do not use passes rather than add an Italian front to its wars in the Low Countries and Germany

See also
List of treaties

References

External links
The Valtelline (1603-1639) 
The Thirty Years War 1621 to 1626
Chronology: Louis XIII (1610-1643)

1621 in France
1621 treaties
Madrid (1621)
Madrid (1621)
France–Spain relations
1621 in Italy
History of Madrid
1621 in Spain